"Forever Love" is the fourteenth single by Japanese heavy metal band X Japan, released on July 8, 1996.

Summary 
The song was written and composed by Yoshiki. An acoustic version appears on their album Dahlia.

The single has been reissued several times. On December 18, 1997, following the announcement of the band's breakup, a different mixed version was released with a live version of "Longing" (recorded at "The Last Live" concert) as a B-side. The original single was reissued again on July 22, 1998, after the death of guitarist hide. A single containing all previous versions (except original karaoke version), as well as a live recording (also recorded at "The Last Live" concert) of the song was released on July 11, 2001.

Also in 2001, the song was used as background music in several commercials for the Japanese Liberal Democratic Party. LDP member Junichiro Koizumi, at that time the country's Prime Minister has expressed fondness for X Japan's music. "Forever Love" appears on the soundtrack of the 1996 animated feature film X.

In 2012, "Forever Love" was covered by both Mr. Big singer Eric Martin in Mr. Rock Vocalist and Megamasso singer Inzargi in Visualist: Precious Hits of V-Rock Cover Song for their respective cover albums. Awoi covered it for the compilation album Counteraction - V-Rock covered Visual Anime songs Compilation-, which was released on May 23, 2012 and features covers of songs by visual kei bands that were used in anime. Death metal band Gyze included a cover of the song on the Japanese edition of their 2019 album Asian Chaos. It was also covered by Mary's Blood for their 2020 cover album Re>Animator, and by Mayo Suzukaze for her 2021 album Fairy ~A・I~ Ai.

In 2019, the city of Tateyama, Chiba (where Yoshiki and Toshi were born) decided to change the departure signal of trains at Tateyama Station to "Forever Love".

Alternative covers

Commercial performance 
The single reached number 1 on the Oricon charts, and charted for 15 weeks. In 1996, with 509,920 copies sold was the 47th best-selling single of the year, being certified Platinum by RIAJ. The edition released in 1997 reached number 13, and charted for 11 weeks, while those in 1998 and 2001 reached number 18 and 19 respectively, and both charted for 4 weeks.

Track listing

Personnel 
Co-Producer – X Japan
Orchestra arranged by – Yoshiki, Dick Marx, Shelly Berg
Scored by – Tom Halm
Orchestra – American Symphony Orchestra
Mixed by – Mike Ging
Recorded by – Mike Ging, Rich Breen, Stan Katayama, Kazuhiko Inada
Assistant engineers – Tal Miller, C.J. Devillar, Dokk Knight, Carl Nappa, Paul Falcone
Mastered by – Stephen Marcussen (Precision Studio)
A&R directed by – Osamu Nagashima
Art directed by – Shige#11
Executive producers – Ryuzo "Jr." Kosugi, Yukitaka Mashimo
Acoustic guitar – Bill Whiteacre ("Forever Love (Last Mix)")

References 

X Japan songs
Songs written by Yoshiki (musician)
Oricon Weekly number-one singles
Heavy metal ballads
1990s ballads
1996 singles
Anime songs
Songs written for films
1996 songs
Torch songs